Calliades may refer to:

 Calliades, a comic poet mentioned by Athenaeus (xiii. p. 577) (perhaps a mistake for Callias (comic poet))
 Probable original Greek for the Biblical (Philistine) name Goliath
 Calliades, the name of two artists, a painter spoken of by Lucian (Dial. Meretr. 8, p. 300), and a statuary, who made a statue of the courtezan  Naeaira
 Calliades (genus), a genus of skipper butterflies